The 2019–20 CEV Challenge Cup was the 40th edition of the CEV Challenge Cup tournament. 40 teams from 28 countries were participating in the competition. The tournament has been cancelled due to the COVID-19 pandemic.

Participating teams

Format 
Qualification Phase (Knock-out with Home and Away Matches):
1st Round (if needed) → 2nd Round

Main Phase (Knock-out with Home and Away Matches):
1/16 Finals → 1/8 Finals→1/4 Finals

Final Phase (Knock-out with Home and Away Matches):
Semi-Finals → Final

Aggregate score is counted as follows: 3 points for 3–0 or 3–1 wins, 2 points for 3–2 win, 1 point for 2–3 loss. In case the teams are tied after two legs, a Golden Set is played immediately at the completion of the second leg.

Qualification phase

2nd round

|}

First leg

|}

Second leg

|}
The match between Erzeni and Partizani has been postponed from 27 November to 4 December due to an earthquake that occurred in Albania

Main phase

16th finals

|}

First leg

|}

Second leg

|}

8th finals

|}

First leg

|}

Second leg

|}

4th finals

|}

First leg

|}

Second leg

|}

References

External links
 Official site 

CEV Challenge Cup
CEV Challenge Cup
CEV Challenge Cup
CEV Challenge Cup